Andrés Bretel (born 24 June 1978) is a Peruvian musician and record producer.

Career

Bretel began his career as a bass guitar player. He played with bands like Nativo Sol and Madre Matilda, and was Master Engineer for Tonka's, album Beta for Morrison Records, in 2005.

References

1978 births
Living people
Peruvian musicians
Peruvian record producers